Erling Andersen (March 7, 1905 – September 11, 1993) was an American cross-country skier. He competed in the men's 18 kilometre event at the 1932 Winter Olympics.

References

External links
 

1905 births
1993 deaths
American male cross-country skiers
Olympic cross-country skiers of the United States
Cross-country skiers at the 1932 Winter Olympics
Skiers from Oslo